The 1970 Rutgers Scarlet Knights football team represented Rutgers University in the 1970 NCAA University Division football season. In their 11th season under head coach John F. Bateman, the Scarlet Knights compiled a 5–5 record and were outscored by their opponents 215 to 193. The team's statistical leaders included Mike Yancheff with 974 passing yards, Larry Robertson with 397 rushing yards, and Al Fenstemacher with 254 receiving yards.

The Scarlet Knights played their home games at Rutgers Stadium in Piscataway, New Jersey, across the river from the university's main campus in New Brunswick.

Schedule

References

Rutgers
Rutgers Scarlet Knights football seasons
Rutgers Scarlet Knights football